The 1824 United States presidential election in New Jersey took place between October 26 and December 2, 1824, as part of the 1824 United States presidential election. Voters chose eight representatives, or electors to the Electoral College, who voted for President and Vice President.

During this election, the Democratic-Republican Party was the only major national party, and four different candidates from this party sought the Presidency. New Jersey voted for Andrew Jackson over John Quincy Adams, William H. Crawford, and Henry Clay. Jackson won New Jersey by over half of the vote.

Results

See also
 United States presidential elections in New Jersey

References

New Jersey
1824
1824 New Jersey elections